Saint Michael's Church is a Roman Catholic church in Luxembourg City, in southern Luxembourg.  It is located in Fishmarket, in the central Ville Haute quarter.

The church is the oldest extant religious site in Luxembourg City.  The first church was built on the spot in 987 as the castle chapel for the Count of Luxembourg.  However, over the following centuries, the building was destroyed, rebuilt, and renovated several times.  Its current appearance dates to 1688, and unites Romanesque and Baroque architectural styles, pre-dating the national Moselle Baroque style.  The building has been restored since then, preserving its original form; it has most recently been renovated in the 1960s, 1980s, and 2003–2004.

See also
 Saint Michael: Roman Catholic traditions and views

Footnotes

Roman Catholic churches in Luxembourg City
Roman Catholic churches in Luxembourg
Architecture in Luxembourg
Roman Catholic churches completed in 1688
17th-century Roman Catholic church buildings

Gothic architecture in Luxembourg